Chaheru  is a village in Phagwara Tehsil in Kapurthala district of Punjab State, India. The village is administrated by a Sarpanch who is an elected representative of village as per the constitution of India and Panchayati raj (India).

Demography 
According to the report published by Census India in 2011, Chaheru has 509 houses with the total population of 2,458 persons of which 1,248 are male and 1,210 females. Literacy rate of  Chaheru is 80.58%, higher than the state average of 75.84%.  The population of children in the age group 0–6 years is 244 which is 9.93% of the total population.  Child sex ratio is approximately 906, higher than the state average of 846.

Population data

Transport 
Phagwara Junction Railway Station, Mauli Halt Railway Station are the very nearby railway stations to Chachoki however, Jalandhar City Rail Way station is 24 km away from the village.  The village is 119 km away from Sri Guru Ram Dass Jee International Airport in Amritsar and the another nearest airport is Sahnewal Airport  in Ludhiana which is located 38 km away from the village.

References

External links
  Villages in Kapurthala
 Kapurthala Villages List

Villages in Kapurthala district